Tagbina, officially the Municipality of Tagbina,  is a 2nd class municipality in the province of Surigao del Sur, Philippines. According to the 2020 census, it has a population of 41,051 people.

It is one of the only two landlocked municipalities in the province along with San Miguel.

Geography

Barangays
Tagbina is politically subdivided into 25 barangays.

Climate

Tagbina has a tropical rainforest climate (Af) with heavy to very heavy rainfall year-round.

Demographics

Economy

References

External links
Tagbina Profile at PhilAtlas.com
Tagbina Profile at the DTI Cities and Municipalities Competitive Index
[ Philippine Standard Geographic Code]
Philippine Census Information
Local Governance Performance Management System

Municipalities of Surigao del Sur